Bruce William Winter (born 2 July 1939) is a conservative evangelical New Testament scholar and Director of the Institute for Early Christianity in the Graeco-Roman World. Winter was warden of Tyndale House at Cambridge (1987–2006), and is currently lecturing part-time in the area of New Testament at Queensland Theological College in Australia, the training arm of the Presbyterian Church of Australia in the state of Queensland.

His academic work has focused on the 1st-century context of the Christian religion in the Roman Empire, about which he has written a number of books and numerous journal articles. He is a member of the Tyndale Fellowship, the Society of Biblical Literature, the British Epigraphic Society, and was elected a member of the Studiorum Novi Testamenti Societas.

Early life and education
Winter completed a B.A. in History, Political Science and Biblical Studies at the University of Queensland.

After working for some time in the Australian Public Service, during which time he received a Diploma in Public Administration, he commenced training for ordination at Moore Theological College in Sydney. In 1973, he left Australia and began parish ministry at the Anglican Saint George's Church, Singapore. After three years, he became the Warden of St Peter's Hall, a part of Trinity Theological College in Singapore.

In the years that followed, Winter gained a M.Th. from South East Asia Graduate School of Theology, followed by his Ph.D. entitled "Philo and Paul among the Sophists: A Hellenistic and Jewish Christian Response", through Macquarie University.

Career
Winter later applied for the position of Warden at Tyndale House, Cambridge (U.K.), and was appointed to the role in August 1987. He remained Warden until the end of 2006, after which he took up the position of Principal of the Queensland Theological College, where he remained until December 2011.

Winter is a former editor of the Tyndale Bulletin. In 2004, a Festschrift was published in his honour. The New Testament in Its First Century Setting: Essays on Context and Background in Honour of B. W. Winter on His 65th Birthday included contributions from I. Howard Marshall, D. A. Carson, and Paul Barnett.

Works

Thesis

Books

 - a development of his Ph.D. thesis

 - a revision of his 1997 work

as Editor

Articles & Chapters

References

External links
 Queensland Theological College
 Tyndale House, Cambridge
 Moore Theological College

1939 births
Academic journal editors
Australian biblical scholars
Australian Presbyterian ministers
Editors of Christian publications
Living people
Macquarie University alumni
Moore Theological College alumni
New Testament scholars
Presidents of Calvinist and Reformed seminaries
University of Queensland alumni